Max Schireson is a technology executive, best known as CEO of MongoDB, and a competitive bridge player. In 2014, he stepped down from CEO to focus more on his family. A tipping point for Schireson came on a long-delayed overnight flight to Austin. The CEO woke up in Tucson to discover his flight had gone through an emergency landing and needed to replace some crew members traumatized by the experience–all while he slept, desperately trying to catch up on rest.

At age 14, Schireson enrolled at the University of California, Berkeley to study math but left before graduating to pursue a career in Silicon Valley.

Schireson has won one North American Bridge Championship, the 2017 Grand National Teams Flight C, an event limited to teams of Non-Life-Masters with under 500 masterpoints.

Since 2014, he serve as a non-executive director at Cray Inc., and a consultant at Battery Ventures.

Personal life
He has a wife who is a doctor and professor. Together they have three children.

References

External links
 Blog

Living people
American computer businesspeople
American technology chief executives
University of California, Berkeley alumni
Year of birth missing (living people)
Silicon Valley people